Kurdistan Region–Kuwait relations are bilateral relations between the Kurdistan Region and Kuwait. While Kurdistan Region has no representation in Kuwait, the latter has a consulate general in Erbil since 2015. Relations are described as a 'historic friendship' and 'brotherly'.  Kuwait has substantial economic investments in the Kurdish region which amounted to over $2 billion in 2017.

Politically, Kuwait is interested in establishing close relations to Kurdistan, especially since it could fragment Iraq more, which would reduce the threat of a second invasion.

High-ranking meetings
In 2013, Kurdish President Barzani visited Kuwait City and met with the Emir of Kuwait Sabah Al-Ahmad Al-Jaber Al-Sabah In 2015, a Kuwaiti governmental delegation visited Kurdistan and met with the Kurdish President Masoud Barzani. In 2017, Kuwait responded to the Kurdish independence referendum by expressing their concern about the referendum breaching the Iraqi constitution or damage Iraqi–Kurdish relations. In November 2018, Barzani visited Kuwait again and met with the Emir of Kuwait Sabah Al-Ahmad Al-Jaber Al-Sabah and Defence Minister Nasser Sabah Al-Ahmad Al-Sabah to discuss the regional political developments.

See also
Iraq–Kuwait relations

References

Kurdistan Region
Kuwait